Naomi Sedney (born 17 December 1994) is a Dutch sprinter. She has been most successful as the anchor of the Dutch Relay team and is co-holder of the national record 4 x 100 m relay. In 2022 her younger sister Zoë Sedney joined her in the Dutch Relay team.

Early career
Sedney started competing in Athletics at the age of eight at the track and field club ARV Ilion in Zoetermeer. Her introduction to the international field was in at the 2011 European Youth Olympic Festival in Trabzon where she represented the Netherlands, winning gold in the 4 × 100 metres relay with the Dutch Relay team (Tessa van Schagen, Sedney, Sacha van Agt and Nadine Visser).

A year later she competed at the 2012 World Junior Championships in Barcelona, placing sixth in the 4 x 100 meters relay with the Dutch team (Schagen, Sedney, Miquella Lobo and Marloes Duijn). 

In 2013 she won bronze with the Dutch relay team (Schagen, Sedney, Van Agt and Eefje Boons) at the European Junior Championships in Rieti.

Breakthrough at senior level
In 2015 Sedney improved her personal best at the 100 metres to 11.34 (+1,8 m/s) at the FBK Games in Hengelo on 24 May; this turned out to be enough to qualify for the 100 metres and the 4 x 100 metres relay at both the 2015 European U23 Championships in Tallinn and the 2015 World Championships in Athletics in Beijing (China). At the European U23 Championships she finished fourth in both the 100 metres with a time of 11,62 and the relay with the Dutch team (Schagen, Van Agt, Sedney and Boons). At the World Championships Sedney stranded in the heats of the 100 metres, finishing fourth in her heat. The Dutch 4 × 100 meters relay team (Visser, Dafne Schippers, Sedney and Jamile Samuel) finished fifth in 42.32, but was disqualified for a changeover infringement. In the heats the team had also run 42.32, a new national record.

In 2016 Sedney competed at the 2016 European Athletics Championships in Amsterdam in both the 100 metres and the 4 x 100 metres relay. In the 100 m she made it to the semi finals where her time of 11.44 was not enough to advance to the finals. The Dutch relay team led by Schippers, with Samuel, Van Schagen and Sedney as anchor runner won the 4 x 100 meters relay with a national record of 42.04.

At the 2016 Summer Olympics Sedney was selected for the Dutch relay team, they were eliminated in the heats due to a botched relay handover between Samuel and Schippers.

In 2017 Sedney was part of the 4 x 100 metres Dutch Relay team (Madiea Ghafoor, Schippers, Sedney, Samuel) at 2017 World Championships in Athletics in London where they finished 8th. Individually Sedney competed in the 100 metres, where she stranded in the heats finishing 30th.

In 2018 Sedney won silver with the 4 x 100 m relay team (Marije van Hunenstijn, Schippers, Samuel and Sedney)at the 2018 European Athletics Championships at the Olympiastadion in Berlin, Germany. Individually she competed in the 100 metres, where she made it to the semi finals finishing 18th overall.

In 2019 at the 2019 World Championships in Doha was part of the Dutch 4 x 100 metres Relay Team (Nargélis Statia Pieter, Van Hunenstijn, Samuel, Sedney). They stranded in the heats, finishing 9th overall.

In 2021 Sedney became national indoor champion 60m in a time of 7.28, hereby qualifying for her first international indoor championships. At the European Indoor Championships in Toruń, Poland Sedney made it to the semi finals finishing 18th overal. Outdoor Sedney competed with the Dutch relay team in both the World Relays in Chorzów, Poland and her second Olympic Games in Tokyo, Japan. In Poland the Dutch team (Samuel, Schippers, Visser, Sedney) became third after a bad handover between Vissers and Sedney eliminated their chances for the gold. At the Olympics a failed handover between Visser and Schippers in the final lead to a DNF for the Dutch relay team (Visser, Schippers, Van Hunnestijn, Sedney).

International competitions

Personal bests
Outdoor
100 metres – 11.24 (+0.2 m/s Gainesville 2018)
200 metres – 23.42 (-0.50 m/s, Tübingen 2017)
Indoor
60 metres – 7.22 (Apeldoorn 2018)
200 metres – 23.46 (Apeldoorn 2016)

References

External links
 

1994 births
Living people
Dutch female sprinters
People from Zoetermeer
World Athletics Championships athletes for the Netherlands
European Athletics Championships medalists
Athletes (track and field) at the 2016 Summer Olympics
Athletes (track and field) at the 2020 Summer Olympics
Olympic athletes of the Netherlands
Olympic female sprinters
Sportspeople from South Holland
21st-century Dutch women